One of the key aspects of the Modern Age of Comic Books was that it was the beginning of big events. In 1984, Marvel Comics debuted the first large crossover, Secret Wars, a storyline featuring the company's most prolific superheroes, which overlapped into a 12-issue limited series and many monthly comic books. A year later, DC Comics introduced its first large scale crossover, Crisis on Infinite Earths, which had long-term effects on the "DC Universe" continuity.

In the early and mid-1990s, big events were regularly published by Marvel and DC, often leading to extra publicity and sales. These events helped fend-off competition from Image Comics, and such events were more likely to become "collector's items." Some events, such as DC's "Zero Hour" and Marvel's "Onslaught saga" spanned a publisher's entire line while others only affected a "family" of interrelated titles. The X-Men and Batman franchises featured crossovers almost annually.

Some of the most significant mid-1990s events, such as Spider-Man's "Clone Saga," Batman's "Batman: Knightfall" and particularly, "The Death of Superman" caused dramatic changes to long-running characters and received coverage in the mainstream media.

These events led to significant sales boosts and publicity, but many fans began to criticize them as excessive and lacking compelling storytelling. They also complained that monthly series had become inaccessible because one had to follow a number of comics to understand the full storyline. By the end of the 1990s, the number of large crossovers decreased, but they were still launched sporadically.

Crisis on Infinite Earths to Countdown

Starting in the early 1960s, DC Comics maintained some aspects of its continuity through the use of a multiverse system of parallel Earths. A cosmic event in the 1985 limited series Crisis on Infinite Earths merged all of these realities and their respective characters into one universe, allowing writers to rewrite from scratch such long-running characters as Batman, Superman and Wonder Woman and also as an attempt at simplifying the DC Universe. In some ways, this helped revitalize DC's characters, though some fans debated (and continue to debate) whether such changes were necessary to begin with or truly beneficial. Events such as the deaths of Supergirl and Barry Allen augmented debate with many fans.

Since Crisis, the trend of such retconning/revamping of characters' histories has increased in superhero comics, as has such large-scale crossover events. Even DC found cause to revamp its universe again (but on a smaller scale) with 1994's Zero Hour crossover storyline. In the late 1990s, the concept of Hypertime was introduced as an attempt to satisfy fans of alternate realities, by stating that all comics published by DC (whether pre- or post-Crisis) had taken place in some corner of reality.

In 2005, the Infinite Crisis series revived the idea of a multiverse. Following the events of the Infinite Crisis series, Superman, Batman and Wonder Woman have temporarily retired their costumed identities. The remaining heroes attend a memorial for Superboy in Metropolis. Time traveler Booster Gold attends the memorial, but when Superman, Batman, and Wonder Woman do not arrive, the change in history makes his robot sidekick Skeets malfunction. This results in Skeets reporting other incorrect historical data. Booster and Skeets search time traveler Rip Hunter's desert bunker for answers, but find it littered with scrawled notes (See "Rip Hunter's lab" below).

The series continues, exploring many of the changes wrought by the events of Infinite Crisis, introducing new characters, killing off old ones, and putting others in new situations.  The series concludes when Rip Hunter reveals that a new multiverse exists, of exactly 52 universes, from Earth-0/New Earth (The primary Earth in continuity) to Earth-51.  The new Multiverse is temporarily threatened by Mr. Mind, who has developed the ability to travel to each universe and "Eat" portions of it, altering its history.  Each new universe was initially identical to New Earth, but Mr. Minds rampage altered each universes history, altering them all, returning the D.C. Multiverse after a fashion.  Once Mr. Mind is stopped, and 52's World War 3 crossover concludes, it is revealed that new Monitors exist for each of the new universes, making 52 monitors in all.  Many of the new universes resemble either popular Elseworlds Earths (Kingdom Come, Batman and Dracula) or are similar to the pre-Crisis Earths 2, X, S, etc.

52, World War 3, 1 Year Later, and Crisis Aftermath indirectly lead into Countdown, which is confirmed to be counting down to the next big event, Final Crisis.

Watchmen
In 1986, DC published two groundbreaking limited series: Watchmen by a British creative team led by writer Alan Moore and artist Dave Gibbons and Batman: The Dark Knight Returns by Frank Miller. The Watchmen helped usher in the era of anti-heroes. But, more importantly, it was one of the most artistically ambitious and psychologically complex comic book series ever produced. It helped gather respect for the medium and set the bar for subsequent writers.

Batman: The Dark Knight Returns

The book is set in the 21st Century although it seems to retain many elements of the Cold War culture. It is a disturbing world where criminals have run amok in the absence of superheroes. Gotham City is terrorized by a gang of teenage murderers, the Mutants. Bruce Wayne, now 55, has been retired from crime fighting for ten years following the death of the second Robin, Jason Todd. Attempting to bury his guilt over Jason's death, Wayne has turned to alcoholism and near-suicidal recreational activities. In an effort to prove to the world (and himself) that one's personal demons can be bested, Wayne has generously funded the rehabilitation of Harvey Dent (a.k.a. Two-Face).

There are two events that push Wayne back into the identity of Batman. The first instance was a chance meeting with two Mutant gang members on the very spot where his parents were killed years before, while the second was Two-Face’s immediate return to crime, despite the years of psychological and cosmetic rehabilitation.

The criminals he now faces are not as organized as they had been, rather they are an unfocused band of kids who kill for money, drugs, or just for thrills. Gotham City has also changed. Whereas the public once hailed Batman as a hero standing up for the citizens of Gotham, now there are some who cry out that Batman is violating the villain’s civil rights. The media, the Mayor’s office, even police officers start to debate Batman's role in society.

The one change that Batman notices the most is the change in himself. He’s older now, not able to leap as easily from roof to roof on as little sleep as he used to. His body takes longer to recover from blows and he gets winded much quicker than he ever remembered in the old days. He has had to accept that he has limitations.

The episodes find Batman foiling a plot by Two Face to blow up Gotham’s twin towers, Joker appearing on a parody of the David Letterman talk show, killing everyone in the audience, and fighting Superman, who works for the President of the United States.

Marvel vs DC
Marvel vs DC was a 1997 comic book mini-series by DC Comics and Marvel. The plot was that two "Brothers" personify the universes that comics fans know as DC and Marvel. After becoming aware of the other's existence, the brothers challenge each other to a series of duels involving each universe's respective superheroes. The series was four comics total.

Dan Jurgens (who wrote the Death of Superman) scripted the series and the outcome was determined by votes sent in by readers. Despite Marvel achieving more votes than its rival, and thus winning more matches, the series' storyline opted not to show one side victorious. The authors reserved calling the winner of six of the eleven matches so they could make the outcome seem close regardless of the votes.

As voters voted Marvel the winner in three of the five "open to vote" matches (DC's Superman and Batman won their matches, whereas Marvel's Spider-Man, Storm, and Wolverine won theirs), this proved a prescient move. The final outcome was a 6–5 Marvel "victory". After Batman defeated Captain America, it was revealed that the Amalgam universe would be used to settle the dispute, making the Marvel victory an ambiguous one.

Ultimately, the Brothers decided to "settle things in their own way" by temporarily creating a new universe. This new universe, called the Amalgam universe, saw a merging of each company's most popular heroes into new ones: Dark Claw (Batman + Wolverine), Spider-Boy (Spider-Man + Superboy), etc. Each new hero starred in a one-shot comic book, all of which were released prior to the series' fourth and final chapter.

The popularity of Amalgam led to another 12 one-shots the following year. Some of the heroes included: Iron Lantern (Iron Man + Green Lantern), Challengers of the Fantastic (Challengers of the Unknown + Fantastic Four), Lobo the Duck (Lobo + Howard the 
Duck).

Civil War

The premise of the Civil War storyline is the introduction of a Super-human Registration Act in the United States. The catalyst is based on a battle involving the New Warriors and a group of villains (Nitro, Cobalt Man, Speedfreek, and Coldheart) in Stamford, Connecticut. This battle occurs while filming a reality television show. Nitro explodes, destroying a local school and the surrounding neighborhood and killing all of the New Warriors, except Speedball. The explosion also kills 612 citizens of the town, including the children at the school. The "Stamford Incident" turns public opinion against superheroes, giving momentum to the Superhuman Registration Act. Angry civilians attack Johnny Storm, the Human Torch. A bereaved mother spits on Tony Stark.

The act requires any person in the United States with superhuman abilities to register with the federal government and receive proper training. Those who sign also have the option of working for S.H.I.E.L.D., earning a salary and benefits such as those earned by other American civil servants. Characters within the superhuman community in the Marvel Universe split into two groups: one advocating registration as a responsible obligation, and the other opposing the law on the grounds that it violates privacy rights.

S.H.I.E.L.D. Director Maria Hill attempts to recruit Captain America for a strike force created to track down superhumans in violation of the act. When Captain America refuses, S.H.I.E.L.D. agents attack him (notably before the act goes into effect), but he escapes. However, Iron Man supports the act and mobilizes many registered superhumans, including Mister Fantastic, Henry Pym, and Spider-Man, who unmasks himself to the world press in order to find and redeem the anti-registration heroes.

Crossovers of the Modern Age

DC Comics

 1985: Crisis on Infinite Earths
 1986: Legends
 1988: Millennium
 1988: Cosmic Odyssey
 1989: Invasion!
 1991: Armageddon 2001
 1991: War of the Gods
 1992: Eclipso: The Darkness Within
 1992-93: The Death and Return of Superman
 1993: Knightfall (Batman)
 1993: Bloodlines
 1993: Trinity
 1994: Worlds Collide (with Milestone Media)
 1994: Zero Hour
 1997: The Final Night
 1997: Genesis
 1998: DC One Million
 2001: Our Worlds at War
 2001: Silver Age
 2004: Identity Crisis
 2004: DC Comics Presents (to honour Julius Schwartz)
 2005: Infinite Crisis
 2006-07: 52
 2007: World War III
 2007-08: Countdown to Final Crisis
 2008: Final Crisis
 2009: Blackest Night
 2010: Brightest Day
 2011: Flashpoint
 2013: Trinity War
 2013-14: Forever Evil
 2014-15: The New 52: Futures End
 2015: Convergence
 2016: DC Rebirth

Golden Age to Present DC List Here

Marvel Comics 
 1982: Marvel Super Hero Contest of Champions
 1984: Secret Wars
 1985-86: Secret Wars II
 1986: Mutant Massacre (X-Men/X-Factor/New Mutants)
 1988: Fall of the Mutants (X-Men/X-Factor/New Mutants)
 1988: Evolutionary War  (1988 Annuals)
 1988: Inferno (X-Men/X-Factor/New Mutants)
 1989: Atlantis Attacks  (1989 annuals)
 1989-90: Acts of Vengeance
 1990-91: X-Tinction Agenda (X-Men/X-Factor/New Mutants)
 1991: Muir Island Saga  (X-Men/X-Factor)
 1991: The Infinity Gauntlet
 1992: Operation: Galactic Storm  (Avengers)
 1992: The Infinity War
 1992-93: X-Cutioner's Song (X-Men/X-Factor/X-Force)
 1992: Rise of the Midnight Sons
 1993: Infinity Crusade
 1993: Maximum Carnage (Spider-Man)
 1993: Fatal Attractions (X-Men)
 1993: Bloodties (Fatal Attractions sequel) (X-Men/Avengers)
 1994: Child's Play
 1994: Phalanx Covenant (X-Men)
 1994: Starblast
 1994: Fall of the Hammer (2099 Universe)
 1994-96: Clone Saga (Spider-Man)
 1995-96: Legion Quest
 1995-96: Age of Apocalypse (X-Men)
 1995: The Crossing (Avengers)
 1996: Onslaught Saga
 1996: One Nation under Doom (2099 Universe)
 1996: Heroes Reborn
 1997: Flashback
 1997: Operation: Zero Tolerance (X-Men)
 1998: The Hunt for Xavier (X-Men)
 1999: The Magneto War
 2000-01: Maximum Security
 2000: Apocalypse: The Twelve
 2001: X-Men: Eve of Destruction
 2002: Infinity Abyss
 2004: Avengers Disassembled (Avengers)
 2004-05: Secret War 
 2005: House of M
 2006: Marvel Civil War
 2006-07: Annihilation
 2007: World War Hulk
 2007-08: Annihilation: Conquest
 2007-08: Messiah CompleX
 2008: Secret Invasion
 2009: Dark Reign
 2009: Ultimatum (Ultimate universe)
 2009: War of Kings (Guardians of the Galaxy)
 2010: Fall of the Hulks (The incredible Hulk)
 2010: Siege
 2010: The Thanos Imperative
 2011: Fear Itself
 2012: Avengers vs. X-Men
 2013: Age of Ultron
 2013: Infinity
 2013-14: Inhumanity
 2014: Original Sin
 2014: AXIS
 2014-15: Spider-Verse (Spider-Man)
 2015: The Black Vortex (Guardians of the Galaxy and X men)
 2015: Secret Wars (2015) 
 2016: Avengers: Standoff! (Avengers)
 2016: Civil War II 
 2017: Secret Empire 
 2018: Damnation (Doctor Strange and Midnight Sons)
 2019: The War of the Realms 
 2020: Empyre

Golden Age to Present Marvel List Here

DC / Marvel
 1996: DC vs Marvel
 1996: DC/Marvel: All Access
 1997: Unlimited Access
 2003: JLA/Avengers

Valiant Comics

 1992: Unity
 1994: The Chaos Effect
 1995: Rampage
 1995: Birthquake
 2000: Unity 2000
 2013: Harbinger Wars
 2014: Armor Hunters

Malibu Ultraverse

 1993: Break-Thru
 1994: Rafferty Saga
 1995: Godwheel
 1995: Ultraverse Spine
 1995: Black September (comics)
 1995: The Phoenix Resurrection

See also
 Golden Age of Comic Books
 Silver Age of Comic Books
 Bronze Age of Comic Books
 Modern Age of Comic Books
 Portrayal of Women in Comic Books

References

Modern Age of Comic Books